Chinook High School is the largest school (by enrollment) operated by Lethbridge School District No. 51. The public high school is one of four in Lethbridge, Alberta, Canada, that serve grades nine through twelve. Completed in 2010, it was the first public high school to open in the city in 50 years; Winston Churchill High School (1960) was the last. It is also the first secondary school to open on the city's west side before Catholic Central High School. Classes began on the afternoon of Monday, August 30, 2010, and a grand opening followed on September 17 at a final, on-budget construction cost of $45.3 million.

The school was built at a  site as part of a $94.3 million Community School project which also included a Catholic Central High School West Campus, Crossings Branch Library, and the Crossings Leisure Complex.

 The first principal was Clark Bosch, formerly of Winston Churchill High School. A high number of the first staff and athletic directors were formerly of Lethbridge Collegiate Institute,

The school features a 344-seat theatre, with similar amenities to the Genevieve E. Yates Memorial Centre in south Lethbridge, as well as a large gymnasium with arena style lighting.

Athletics
The school is currently in its eleventh year of operation. Chinook offers a choice of 11 different sports. They include, football, volleyball, basketball, rugby, baseball, curling, track and field, cross country, golf, badminton and slo-pitch. Of these 11 sports, only 9 are ASAA recognized. Baseball and slo-pitch are not recognized because of the inability to play these sports in 5 out of the 8 zones due to the weather.

Nearby Amenities
The school neighbourhood includes the Crossings Leisure Complex. The complex contains an ice arena complex; an aquatics centre with water slides, lazy river and whirlpools; a multi-sport field house with fitness centre, indoor track, and gymnasiums; and child a minding area with an indoor playground. Also nearby are a number of nearby leased commercial properties in the neighborhood known as The Crossings.

CHS Sound 
The school has a vast arts department including guitar, rock and pop, drama, dance, and art.  Throughout the school year the guitar, rock and pop, drama, and dance classes will have concerts within the school's media center.  In order to run all of these shows, an audio technicians, lighting personnel, and backstage managers are required.  A group of three students who work under the CHS Sound name (est. 2016) help in all three of these tasks, but mainly in the audio technician positions, to help with these shows.

References

Educational institutions established in 2010
High schools in Alberta
Community Schools in Alberta
2010 establishments in Alberta
Schools in Lethbridge